Blest may refer to:
 Alberto Blest Gana (1830–1920), a Chilean novelist and diplomat
 Clotario Blest Riffo (1899–1990), a Chilean trade union leader and social activist
 Another form of the noun "blessed", more popular in old English.
 William Cunningham Blest, an Irish doctor, president of the first Medical Society of Chile
 Puerto Blest, a village and municipality in Río Negro Province in Argentina